Rubinisphaera is a genus of bacteria from the family of Planctomycetaceae with two known species. Rubinisphaera brasiliensis has been isolated from water from the Lagoa Vermelha from Brazil.

See also 
 List of bacterial orders
 List of bacteria genera

References

Bacteria genera
Monotypic bacteria genera
Planctomycetota